

Center Stage or Centre Stage may refer to:

Films, TV, radio
 Center Stage (1991 film), a Hong Kong film by Stanley Kwan
 Center Stage (2000 film), a film by Nicholas Hytner
 Center Stage: Turn It Up, a 2008 sequel to Center Stage
 Center Stage: On Pointe, a 2016 sequel
 Center Stage (TV series), a 1954 American TV series
 Centerstage, a Philippine reality show on GMA Network

Theater
 Center Stage (theater), a theater in Baltimore, Maryland
 Centre Stage (theater), a theater in Greenville, South Carolina
 Center Stage (Atlanta), a theater in Atlanta, Georgia
 Portland Center Stage, a theater company based in Portland, Oregon
 Richmond CenterStage, a performing arts center in Richmond, Virginia

Music
 Center Stage (Tommy Emmanuel album), 2008
 Center Stage (Helen Reddy album), 1998
 Centre Stage (album), a 2013 album by Kimberley Walsh
 Center Stage, a 1990 album by Anthony Warlow

See also
 Blocking (stage)